Tower Mountain, elevation , is a summit in the San Juan Mountains located northeast of Silverton, Colorado.

See also

List of mountain peaks of North America
List of mountain peaks of the United States
List of mountain peaks of Colorado

References

External links

Mountains of Colorado
Mountains of San Juan County, Colorado
North American 4000 m summits